Devyani Saltzman is a Canadian writer, curator and multidisciplinary cultural programmer. She works on projects nationally and internationally, and also as a consultant in arts and culture, collaborating with organizations on innovation in programming and people-centred and values-based cultural strategy. She has held senior positions in three of Canada's major cultural institutions, most recently as the Director of Public Programming at the Art Gallery of Ontario.

Early life and education 
Devyani Saltzman was born in 1979, the granddaughter of the late Canadian weatherman Percy Saltzman and the daughter of film directors Paul Saltzman and Deepa Mehta. Paul Saltzman, her father, is Jewish Ukrainian; her mother Indian Hindu. They separated when she was 11 years old.

Saltzman received her degree in Human Sciences from Hertford College at Oxford University in 2003. She specialized in sociology and anthropology.

Writing career 
Devyani Saltzman is the author of Shooting Water: A Memoir of Second Chances, Family, and Filmmaking, as well as articles for The Globe and Mail, The National Post, The Literary Review of Canada, the Atlantic, Tehelka, Marie Claire, Room literary journal and The Walrus Magazine. Her debut book Shooting Water: A Memoir of Second Chances, Family, and Filmmaking details the making of her mother, Deepa Mehta’s, third film in her “Elements” trilogy, entitled Water. It was published in Canada (2005), the US and India and received "starred reviews" in both Publishers Weekly and the Library Journal and was called 'A poignant memoir' by The New York Times. Her freelance writing subjects include interviews with Pico Iyer, Sarah Polley, Floria Sigismondi and articles on India, long-term care facilities and immigrant domestic workers.

Current projects 
Saltzman is the founding curator, literary programming, at Luminato, Toronto's Festival of Arts and Creativity and has been involved in a number of arts initiatives including Project Bookmark Canada, The Toronto Museum Project as well as being a juror for the National Magazine Awards, Canada Council for the Arts, Ontario Arts Council and The Hilary Weston Writers' Trust Prize for Nonfiction. In 2014 she was appointed Director of Literary Arts at Banff Centre for Arts and Creativity, Canada's national arts hub, where she oversaw year-round programming and public events. In 2018 she was appointed Director of Public Programming for the Art Gallery of Ontario.

Awards and Governance

References

Alumni of Hertford College, Oxford
Canadian memoirists
Canadian art curators
Canadian people of Indian descent
Canadian people of Ukrainian-Jewish descent
Place of birth missing (living people)
Year of birth missing (living people)
Canadian women journalists
Living people
Canadian women memoirists
Canadian women curators